Tinqueux is a commune in the Marne department in north-eastern France. It is a suburb, adjacent to the west of Reims. Tinqueux is twinned with Myślenice, Poland.

Population

See also
Communes of the Marne department
List of twin towns and sister cities in France

References

External links

Official Web site

Communes of Marne (department)